Chersotis cuprea is a moth of the family Noctuidae.

Subspecies
There are three recognised subspecies:
Chersotis cuprea cuprea
Chersotis cuprea japonica (Japan)
Chersotis cuprea schaeferi (Eastern Tibet)

Description
This species shows a high variability in the basic colors. Usually the upper side of the forewings is coppery reddish brown (hence the Latin name cuprea), with dark brown markings outlined in thin whitish. The underside of the forewing is dark gray-brown. The hind wings are monochrome gray-brown. Caterpillars are gray-brown, with dark dorsal markings and bright side stripes.
Warren (1914) states R. cuprea Schiff. (= haematitedea Esp.) Forewing dull brown, the median area below subcostal vein dark brown; veins and edges of stigmata very finely pale, the stigmata deeper brown; costa darker with fine pale speckling; a dark shade before submarginal line; hindwing greybrown, the fringe yellowish. North Europe (except Britain), Armenia and Kamschatka. — Larva dull brown, with 3 whitish dorsal lines, some oblique black subdorsal streaks, and a grey lateral line; on various low plants.

Biology
The moth flies from July to September depending on the location. The larvae feed on Vaccinium myrtillus, on Asteraceae (Centaurea or Taraxacum) and on other plants.

Distribution
This species can be found in Northern Europe, the Pyrenees, Central Europe down to Greece and east through the Ukraine, Siberia, Turkey, the Caucasus and Armenia, up to China and Japan.

Habitat
These moths live in forests and in mountain forests, in nutrient-poor grasslands and especially in partly humid alpine pastures.

Bibliography
 Michael Fibiger: Noctuinae II. - Noctuidae Europaeae, Volume 2. Entomological Press, Sorø, 1993, 
 Erstbeschreibung: (1775): Ankündung eines systematischen Werkes von den Schmetterlingen der Wienergegend herausgegeben von einigen Lehrern am k. k. Theresianum. 1-323, pl. I a+b, Frontispiz. Wien (Augustin Bernardi).
 LepIndex: The Global Lepidoptera Names Index. Beccaloni G.W., Scoble M.J., Robinson G.S. & Pitkin B.
 Manfred Koch: Wir bestimmen. Schmetterlinge. Band 3. Eulen. Neumann Verlag Radebeul 2. Auflage 1972
 Hochspringen Bundesamt für Naturschutz (Hrsg.): Rote Liste gefährdeter Tiere Deutschlands. Landwirtschaftsverlag, Münster 1998,

References

External links
Chersotis cuprea at Lepiforum

Noctuinae
Moths of Asia
Moths of Europe